This is a '''list of television stations in Central Asia.

Kazakhstan 
Kazakh Television & Radio Corporation

Kazakhstan
KAZSport (Sports Channel)
Balapan (Children/Youth channel)

Private/Other:

31 Kanal (Website)
Gakku TV
KTK (Kommerceskiyi Televizioniyi Kanal) (Website)
MTV
NTK-TV (Website)
Cartoon Network
Nickelodeon
Nick Jr.
 Toi Duman
 Almaty TV
 Zhuldyz TV

Khabar Agency

24 Kz (News Channel)
Kazakh TV (Satellite Channel)
Khabar TV
Bilim Zhäne Mädeniet (Culture & Education Channel) (Website)

Kyrgyzstan 
Public Broadcasting Corporation of Kyrgyz Republic - KTRK

KTRK
Balastan (Children Channel)
Madaniyat (Cultural Channel)
Muzyka (Music & Entertainment Channel)
KTRK Sport (Sport Channel)

Private/Other:

ElTR TV
Osh TV (Osh city's TV Channel)
Yntymak TV (Website)
Sanat TV
Sentiabr TV
 NewTV

Tajikistan 
TV Tajikistan

1TV First Channel (now Tajikistan)
TV Safina
Jahonnamo (National and International News Channel, in the Tajik language. Sometimes the channel also broadcasts news in English and Russian) 
Bakhoriston (Children/Youth Channel)
TV Varzish (Sport Channel, first HD channel in Tajikistan)
 TV Sinamo

Turkmenistan 

 Altyn Asyr
 Miras 
 Ýaşlyk (Youth channel)
 Turkmenistan (International channel broadcast in seven languages: Turkmen, Russian, English, French, Chinese, Arabic and Persian)
 Türkmen Owazy (Music channel) 
 Aşgabat (Focusing on the capital of Turkmenistan) 
 Turkmenistan Sport (Sports channel)

Uzbekistan

See also

 Lists of television channels
 List of television stations in Western Asia
 List of television stations in Southeast Asia
 List of television stations in South Asia
 List of television stations in East Asia

References

Television stations in Central Asia
Central Asia
Television